Oleh Kerchu (born 6 July 1984) is a Ukrainian former footballer and currently the youth head coach for FSC Bukovyna Chernivtsi.

Playing career 
Kerchu began his career in 2001 with Bukovyna Chernivtsi in the Ukrainian First League. In 2006, he signed with FC Desna Chernihiv, and played with FC Prykarpattya Ivano-Frankivsk in the Ukrainian Second League where won promotion to the first league in 2007. In 2008, he returned to his hometown club Bukovyna, and served as team captain. During his second tenure with Bukovyna he helped the club win the second league title during the 2009/2010 season which secured them a promotion to the first league.

In 2014, he went north of the border to Belarus to sign with FC Naftan Novopolotsk in the Belarusian Premier League. After one season with Naftan he returned to Ukraine to play with Nyva Ternopil where he was appointed the team captain. After a brief stint with Bukovyna he went overseas to Canada to sign with FC Ukraine United in the Canadian Soccer League. In his debut season he appeared in 20 matches and recorded 3 goals, and secured a postseason berth by finishing second in the standings.

Kerchu signed with FC Vorkuta for the 2017 CSL season, and was named the team captain. Throughout the season he assisted in securing the regular season title. In his second season with Vorkuta he assisted in securing the CSL Championship. In 2019, he returned to play with Bukovyna Chernivtsi in the Ukrainian Second League.

Managerial career  
In 2020, he was named the youth head coach for FSC Bukovyna Chernivtsi.

Honors

FC Vorkuta 
 CSL Championship (1): 2018
 Canadian Soccer League First Division (1): 2017

References

External links
Profile at FFU website 

1984 births
Living people
Ukrainian footballers
Ukrainian expatriate footballers
Expatriate footballers in Belarus
FC Desna Chernihiv players
FC Prykarpattia Ivano-Frankivsk (2004) players
FC Bukovyna Chernivtsi players
FC Naftan Novopolotsk players
FC Nyva Ternopil players
Association football midfielders
FC Ukraine United players
FC Continentals players
Belarusian Premier League players
Canadian Soccer League (1998–present) players
Expatriate soccer players in Canada
Ukrainian First League players
Ukrainian expatriate sportspeople in Belarus
Ukrainian expatriate sportspeople in Canada
Ukrainian Second League players
Ukrainian football managers
Sportspeople from Chernivtsi